Eudoliche longa is a moth of the subfamily Arctiinae. It is found in French Guiana.

References

 Natural History Museum Lepidoptera generic names catalog

Lithosiini